Armando Visconti (born 26 October 1989) is an Italian footballer who plays for the amateur side UC Bisceglie.

Visconti started his career at Pomigliano d'Arco before joining A.S. Roma Allievi Nazionali team in 2005. A year later he was promoted to the Primavera team. In 2007, he joined Avellino, of Serie B.

After Avellino's bankruptcy in July 2009, he was signed by Bari. After a season on loan, Visconti returned to Bari at the start of 2011–12 Serie B. However, he failed to play any game for the first team. In January 2012 Visconti left the club again.

Visconti wore no.98 shirt for Bari.

Visconti played for Italy U20 team at the 2009 Mediterranean Games.

References

External links

Profile at FIGC

Italian footballers
Serie B players
A.S. Roma players
U.S. Avellino 1912 players
S.S.C. Bari players
U.S. Vibonese Calcio players
Association football forwards
Footballers from Naples
1989 births
Living people
Mediterranean Games silver medalists for Italy
Mediterranean Games medalists in football
Competitors at the 2009 Mediterranean Games